Narusawa Dam is an earthfill dam located in Gunma Prefecture in Japan. The dam is used for irrigation. The catchment area of the dam is 2 km2. The dam impounds about 16  ha of land when full and can store 1283 thousand cubic meters of water. The construction of the dam was started on 1947 and completed in 1949.

References

Dams in Gunma Prefecture